I diavoli di Spartivento (also known as Weapons of Vengeance, Weapons of War, The Devils of Spartivento, Arms of the Avenger, Curse of the Haunted Forest and The Fighting Legions) is a 1963 Italian adventure film directed by  Leopoldo Savona and  starring John Drew Barrymore and  Scilla Gabel.

Plot

Cast 
 
John Drew Barrymore  as Lotario Duchesca
 Scilla Gabel   as  Isabella 
 Giacomo Rossi Stuart as   Vannozzo Duchesca 
 Romano Ghini as   Demetrio Duchesca 
 Jany Clair as   Fiammetta 
 Mario Pisu as   Eusebio Pimperval 
  Michel Lemoine as   Viscount Lagover  
  Ugo Sasso as   Braccio Da Prato 
  Amedeo Trilli as   Basilio 
  Ugo Silvestri as   Duke of Collinalto 
 Franco Balducci as   Capitain of the Duke
  Gian Pietro Calasso as   Mute Servant of Eusebio 
 Ignazio Leone as   Servant of Isabella 
  Antonella Murgia as   Silvia

References

External links

Italian adventure films
Films directed by Leopoldo Savona
Films scored by Francesco De Masi
1960s Italian films